.ht is the Internet country code top-level domain (ccTLD) for Haiti.

ht is also the language code for Haitian Creole, Kreyòl Ayisyen.

See also
Internet in Haiti

References

External links
 IANA .ht whois information
 .ht domain registration website

Country code top-level domains
Communications in Haiti

sv:Toppdomän#H